= Guotong Zhou =

Chinese engineer

Guotong Zhou is a Chinese engineer of the Georgia Institute of Technology's satellite campus in Shenzhen. She was named a Fellow of the Institute of Electrical and Electronics Engineers (IEEE) in 2012 for her contributions to the analysis of nonlinear systems and signals.

== Education ==
- B. Sc. degree in biomedical engineering and instrumentation, Tianjin University, July 1989.
- University of Virginia M.Sc. degree in biophysics (May 1992), M.Sc. degree in electrical engineering (January 1993), and Ph.D. degree in electrical engineering (January 1995)
